|}

The Relkeel Hurdle is a Grade 2 National Hunt hurdle race in Great Britain which is open to horses aged five years or older. It is run on the New Course at Cheltenham over a distance of about 2 miles and 4½ furlongs (2 miles 4 furlongs and 56 yards, or 4,074 metres), and during its running there are ten hurdles to be jumped. The race is scheduled to take place each year on New Year's Day.

The event is named after Relkeel, a three-time winner of Cheltenham's Bula Hurdle in the late 1990s. The Relkeel Hurdle was given Grade 2 status in 2006.

The race was first run in 1988 as the Sport of Kings Challenge.  The race was renamed the Lonesome Glory Hurdle in 1993, after the American-trained challenger who had won the race the previous year.

The current name was adopted in 2000. The race was originally run at Cheltenham's International meeting in early December before being moved to the course's New Year Day fixture from the 2016 running.

Winners

See also
 Horse racing in Great Britain
 List of British National Hunt races

References

 Racing Post:
, 
 pedigreequery.com – Relkeel Hurdle – Cheltenham.
 telegraph.co.uk – "Cheltenham racing abandoned after rain" (2008).

National Hunt races in Great Britain
Cheltenham Racecourse
National Hunt hurdle races
Recurring sporting events established in 1988
1988 establishments in England